"Doris Day" is a song from 1982 by Dutch band Doe Maar. It was the title-track off their third album Doris Day en Andere Stukken and became their first top 10-hit.

Bass-player Henny Vrienten, frontman alongside pianist Ernst Jansz, wrote "Doris Day" as a complaint about TV-boredom (which includes the screening of a Doris Day-movie) best tackled by pressing the off-button and going out. The original lyrics also mentioned movie-expert Simon van Collem, but this was altered to "ein Wiener Operette" when he appeared to be the father of the band's new drummer Rene (1961).

"Doris Day" catapulted the otherwise thirtysomething Doe Maar into superstardom, but overexposure and creative exhaustion would split them up two years later. Vrienten, who went on to compose TV- and movie-soundtracks, was quoted in 1985 : "You can flush 'Doris Day' down the toilet anytime you like; it's the worst song I ever wrote. Rhyming for rhyming's sake, and stuff. And the worst thing of all is that it drew full crowd-participation every night". He later had a change of heart.

Since 2000, Doe Maar play occasional reunion-shows; in 2012 they celebrated the 30th anniversary of "Doris Day" at the Symphonica in Rosso-concert series.

Sources
Critical reception (nl)

1982 singles
Doe Maar songs
Dutch-language songs
1982 songs
Songs about television